Open access scholarly communication of Ireland can be found by searching "RIAN," a national portal maintained by the Irish Universities Association.

Repositories 
There are a number of collections of scholarship in Ireland housed in digital open access repositories. They contain journal articles, book chapters, data, and other research outputs that are free to read.

See also
 Internet in the Republic of Ireland
 Education in the Republic of Ireland
 Media of Ireland
 Open access in other countries

References

Further reading

External links
 
 
 
 
 

Academia in the Republic of Ireland
Communications in the Republic of Ireland
Ireland
Science and technology in the Republic of Ireland